Mark Poole (born August 31, 1963) is an American fantasy artist, best known for working on the first set of Magic: the Gathering cards.

Biography
Poole was born on August 31, 1963 in Goldsboro, North Carolina. He graduated from University of South Carolina in 1986 with a BFA in fine arts and design. Poole works mostly in acrylic, oil and digital media.

He has also worked for companies such as White Wolf Publishing, Warcraft, Sony Online Entertainment, Upper Deck and Ziggurat Games. His work was featured at FantasyCon in July 2014.

His artwork featured on the Magic: the Gathering basic Island card from the Summer Magic 1994 set fetches about $600.

Collectible card game credits
 Anachronism
 Battlelords
 BattleTech
 Deadlands: Doomtown
 Dragon Storm (not a CCG, but a collectible common-deck card game)
 Dune
 Fantasy Adventures
 Galactic Empires
 Guardians
 Legend of the Five Rings
 Magic: the Gathering
 Middle-earth
 Mortal Kombat
 Mystical Empire
 Mythos
 Netrunner
 Redemption
 Shadowfist
 Tempest of the Gods
 Vampire: The Eternal Struggle
 Warhammer 40,000
 Warlords
 World of Warcraft

Role-playing game credits
 Cover of Aftermath Technology gamebook (1992)
 Aria: Canticle of the Monomyth gamebook (1994)
 Babylon 5 Project Sourcebook, and Earthforce Sourcebook (1997)
 Dungeons & Dragons Magic Item Compendium Sourcebook, and Magic of Incarnum Sourcebook (2007)
 Fantasy Role Playing Gamer's Bible (1996)
 Promethean: The Created Pandora's book, Pandora's box, Strange Alchemies game supplements (2006)
 Prophecy rulebook (2007)
 Stalking the Steel City gamebook cover (1992)
 Worlds of Darkness: Second Sight character and setting book (2006)

Other credits
 Adventurer's Limited issue #1 (1995)
 Clout Fantasy chip art (2005)
 Cover of Dragon issue #201 (January 1994)
 The Duelist interior artwork; issues #2-3 (1994)
 Legends of Norrath (digital collectible card game)
 Star Wars Galaxies

References

External links 
 Official Site

1963 births
Fantasy artists
Game artists
Living people
Role-playing game artists